Soft! is a novel by British writer Rupert Thomson, written in 1998 London.

Acting as participants in a sleep experiment, the protagonists of this novel find themselves the unwitting word-of-mouth advertisers of  'Kwench!', a new soft drink.

1998 British novels
Novels about advertising
Bloomsbury Publishing books